Christopher Needler (4 September 1944 – 23 December 2022) was a British businessman who was the Chairman of Hull City.

Needler was born on 4 September 1944, near Kingston upon Hull, and attended Repton School in Derbyshire. He spent five years qualifying as a Chartered Accountant (CPA) and three additional years as a mature student at Trinity College, Cambridge.  
 
In 1971, he joined his father in the family business, Hoveringham Group Ltd., and took over as Chairman in 1975, following his father’s premature death. The business was sold to Tarmac plc in 1981, following which Needler continued his involvement in a number of private family businesses. In July 1997, when he relinquished his family's long-held control over the Hull City Football Club, the Needler family's control of the club was at an end.

Once retired from all his previous businesses, in 2005 he began a debt counselling company called DebtWatchers. 

Needler latterly lived in Monaco, and had a partner and two step children.

He died on 23 December 2022, at the age of 78.

References 

1944 births
2022 deaths
Businesspeople from Kingston upon Hull
Sportspeople from Kingston upon Hull
British expatriates in Monaco
English football managers